James Irwin Charter High School (JICHS) is a charter secondary school in Colorado Springs, Colorado, United States, serving student grades in the ninth through twelfth grades. The school is named in honor of astronaut James Irwin, the eighth person to walk on the moon.

References

External links

High schools in Colorado Springs, Colorado
Educational institutions established in 2000
2000 establishments in Colorado